Juan Miguel Bretón Mieses (24 October 1960 - 1 November 2009) also known as Micky Bretón was a Dominican director, writer, and producer best known for his TV series “Los Relatos de Micky Bretón” that aired in the Dominican Republic.

Biography
While he was known for the programme, he began his career in the children's area "La casa de Pequita", driving Anita Ontiveros in the mid-1970s. In this programme, he played a character named Trigolitos.

At the end of 1979, he worked as editor of the newly opened Teleantillas, channel 2, traveling the following year to study Television at the Complutense University of Madrid, Spain.

The European country you worked in Televisión Española and a producer of videos.

Upon his return in 1995, he took over as director of the program "Nuria en el 9", who coincidentally had worked in "La casa de Pequita".

Then, also by Nuria Piera, he wrote and directed "Al filo de la vida", in which starts the dramatized stories that catapulted him.

Since 2004 he produced, wrote and directed "Relatos de Miky Bretón", after being a producer of several programs, including "Nadie es perfecto" and "Noche de luz".

Death
Breton was murdered in a motel (cabaña) on November 1st, 2009.

External links

1960 births
2009 deaths
Dominican Republic film directors
Deaths by firearm in the Dominican Republic
2009 murders in North America